Anne Will is a German political talk show on Das Erste with the slogan „Politisch denken, persönlich fragen“ ("Think political, ask personal"). It is named after the moderator Anne Will.

History 

The show Anne Will replaced Sabine Christiansen. Günther Jauch, originally planned for Christiansen's successor, canceled after several months of negotiations because he was unable to meet ARD's demand for journalistic exclusivity. The directors of the state broadcasting corporations then agreed to make the broadcasting slot available to Anne Will. The first show with her was broadcast on September 16, 2007.

On the show, Will interviewed Chancellor Angela Merkel in September 2009 (shortly before the 2009 election), in October 2015, in February 2016, November 2016 and in June 2018 (following the 44th G7 summit). Among the international dignitaries who have appeared on the show were the foreign ministers of Austria and Luxembourg, Sebastian Kurz (2016) and Jean Asselborn (2014, 2015 and 2018).

Audience share 
Since 2016, Anne Will is the most watched talk show on the German television. While in 2015, each program was seen by an average of 1.5 million viewers, it reached an average of 4 million in 2016 after a change of the channel place. In 2017 and 2018, the show reached an average of 4.1 and 3.4 million viewers. Amid the COVID-19 pandemic in Germany, the show reached a new record when the audience share was at an average of 15.2 percent in 2021, making it by the most-watched talk show in German-language television.

Reception 
The show has been criticized for its unbalanced treatment of topics. According to a 2020 study, topics like science, culture, education, social things and religion rarely have their say.

Awards 

 2019: Die Goldene Kartoffel (negative price) for its content

External links 

 Anne Will on IMDb
 Official website (in German)

References 

German television shows
German television talk shows
2007 German television series debuts
2000s German television series
2010s German television series
2020s German television series